Wade Whitney (born December 13, 1967 in Baltimore, Maryland) is a retired American soccer right-sided defender and midfielder who was a former All-American representing Columbia, Maryland.

Youth 
Whitney grew up in Columbia, Maryland where he attended Hammond High School.  He was a 1985 Parade Magazine All-American from Parade magazine and NSCAA in 1984-85.  After his youth career with Region I and US Youth Soccer Olympic Development Program he went on to attend North Carolina State University.  In his four years at State, Whitney played alongside Tab Ramos, Dario Brose and Henry Gutierrez, finishing his career with the Wolfpack as captain in 1988.

Raleigh Flyers 
Whitney was part of the inaugural season of the Flyers in 1993 after playing for Raleigh United from 1990–1992.  He played midfielder and a right-sided wingback with the Raleigh Flyers in 1993, 1994, 1996, 1997 and 1998.

Coaching 
Whitney was a select team coach and technical director for Capital Area Soccer League in Raleigh, North Carolina in 1998 and 1999. In 2000, he was the director of marketing for the Raleigh Wings.

Current 
Whitney resides in Maryland.

References

Living people
1967 births
American soccer players
NC State Wolfpack men's soccer players
USISL players
Raleigh Flyers players
Association football defenders
Association football midfielders